KCJC (102.3 FM, River Country 102.3) is a radio station broadcasting a country music format. Licensed to Dardanelle, Arkansas, United States, the station is currently owned by Bobby Caldwell's East Arkansas Broadcasters, through licensee EAB of Russellville, LLC, and features programming from Citadel Media and Dial Global.

History
Central Arkansas Broadcasting Company, Inc., put KCAB-FM on the air in 1965 as the sister station to KCAB (then at 1320 AM). The call letters were changed to KWKK on May 6, 1974, and the current KCJC on October 1, 1995.

Formerly owned by Max Media, KCJC and five other stations were sold to East Arkansas Broadcasters for $3 million; the transaction was consummated on January 9, 2014.

References

External links
 
 

Country radio stations in the United States
CJC
Radio stations established in 1965
1965 establishments in Arkansas
Dardanelle, Arkansas